Peoplefund.it is an online crowdfunding platform in the UK that operates in an 'All or Nothing' method for individuals or groups to raise funds for creative projects. It was started by KEO digital, a digital media company based in London, UK.

The Platform

Peoplefund.it operates on the "all or nothing" way of funding. Projects upload their information including a project description, list of rewards and a short video. They choose a target and if they reach it before their time runs out then the money is transferred to them. The most important aspect of the projects are the rewards they offer as these will attract supporters to each project.

Peoplefund.it charges 5% of contributed funds, plus 3% payment processing fees, if a project is completely funded.

Peoplefund.it merged with WeDidThis (another UK crowdfunding platform).

History

In 2009 KEO digital set up a site called Landshare (garden sharing), which brings together people interested in home-grown food, connecting those who have land to share with those who need land for cultivating food. As a result of these other projects KEO digital were confronted with a demand of people suggesting ideas. Peoplefund.it was designed and developed in a few months to allow users to set up their own projects and came to light in November 2011.

Peoplefund.it are supported by Nesta

Projects
The Bicycle Academy raised over £40,000 through Peoplefund.it in November 2011 in 6 days. 
Young Rewired State raised £20,000 after being mentioned by Stephen Fry and being featured on TechCrunch

See also 
 Comparison of crowd funding services

References

External links
 

Defunct crowdfunding platforms of the United Kingdom